Sutton, also known as Sutton Lane Ends, is a civil parish in Cheshire East, England. It contains 44 buildings that are recorded in the National Heritage List for England as designated listed buildings. Of these, two are listed at Grade II*, the middle of the three grades, and the others are at Grade II. The parish is mainly rural, consisting of farmland and moorland. Many of the listed buildings are farmhouses and farm buildings, or houses with associated structures. Around the parish is a series of parish boundary stones. Passing through the west of the parish is the Macclesfield Canal, and there are listed buildings associated with this, including bridges, an aqueduct, and a milestone. Other listed buildings include a medieval wayside cross, a chapel and chaplain's house, a public house, and a mileplate.

Key

Buildings

References

Citations

Sources

 

 

 
 

Listed buildings in the Borough of Cheshire East
Lists of listed buildings in Cheshire